Recreation Day is the fourth studio album by Swedish progressive metal band Evergrey. It was released on 11 March 2003 through Inside Out Music and re-released in 2018 via AFM Records. Recording sessions took place at Los Angered Recordings in Gothenburg. Production was handled by members Tom S. Englund and Henrik Danhage. The album's lyrics deal mainly with personal reformation. It is the first album with longtime keyboardist Rikard Zander, and the last to feature original drummer Patrick Carlsson.

A music video was produced for the song "Blinded", which saw substantial airplay on Headbangers Ball in late 2003. It would soon be followed by the power ballad "I'm Sorry".

Track listing

Personnel
 Tom S. Englund – vocals, guitar, arranger, producer
 Henrik Danhage – guitar, arranger, producer
 Michael Håkansson – bass, arranger
 Patrick Carlsson – drums, percussion, arranger
 Rikard Zander – keyboards
 Carina Kjellberg – female vocals
 The Mercury Choir (courtesy of the Swedish Catholic Church) – choir
 Fredrik Nordström – mixing
 Patrik Jerksten – mixing
 Anders Allhage – engineering
 Kristian "Rizza" Isaksson – engineering
 Göran Finnberg – mastering
 Mattias Norén – artwork, design
 Rex Zachary – photography
 Lars Karlsson – photography

Charts

References

External links

2003 albums
Evergrey albums
Inside Out Music albums